Guy Morgan (26 December 1907 – 29 July 1973) was a Welsh rugby union player who captained Wales in 1929. He also played cricket for Glamorgan County Cricket Club.

Rugby career
Morgan was born in Garnant and gained his first international cap playing for Wales Secondary Schools, he was educated at Christ College, Brecon, in a team that contained future Wales full internationals Harry Bowcott and J.D. Bartlett. While at Cambridge University he played for the University rugby team in a Varsity match. Between 1926 and 1929, Morgan won four Blues, and gained his first cap while still at Cambridge, in a game against France at St Helens. It was an incredible debut for Morgan, scoring a try and being prominent in the scoring of four others. By the time he played his third international game in 1929 he was playing for Swansea, and on 2 February that year, at the age of 22, he was captain of his country. He would play just another four games, three more as captain.

International games played
Wales
  1929
  1927, 1929, 1930
  1927, 1929, 1930
  1929

Biography

References

1907 births
1973 deaths
Welsh rugby union players
Wales international rugby union players
Wales rugby union captains
Welsh cricketers
Cambridge University cricketers
Glamorgan cricketers
Cambridge University R.U.F.C. players
Barbarian F.C. players
Swansea RFC players
London Welsh RFC players
Rugby union players from Garnant
Cricketers from Carmarthenshire
Wales cricketers
People educated at Christ College, Brecon
Rugby union centres
Rugby union players from Carmarthenshire